Game developer may refer to:

 Video game developer, an individual or company working on video game production
 Video game publisher, a company funding video game developer(s)
 Video game producer, a manager of game development team
 Game designer, a member of game development team, responsible for game's design
 Game programmer, a member of game development team, responsible for game's codebase
 Game Developer (magazine), a defunct monthly trade periodical for the video game industry
 Game Developer (website), formerly Gamasutra, the ongoing sister publication to the magazine of the same name

See also 

 Game development
 Game design
 Game programming
 Video game design
 List of video game companies
 List of video game industry people
 List of video game publishers